Mario Carević (born 29 March 1982) is a Croatian professional football manager and former player who played as a midfielder. He is currently the manager of Slovenian Second League side Krka.

Carević made his debut for the Croatia national team in a friendly match against Macedonia in 2003. While he was a regular for the Croatian youth selections from under-15 to under-21, he was capped only once for the senior national team.

Club career 
Carević started his professional career at Hajduk Split, playing five seasons before moving to Saudi Arabia to play for Al-Ittihad (Jeddah). He then spent a season in Germany playing for Bundesliga side VfB Stuttgart, before returning to Split in 2006 on a one-year loan. In the season 2007–08 he played for SC Lokeren, a club from Belgian first division. In 2010, he joined Kortrijk, who loaned him out to Maccabi Petah Tikva of the Israeli Premier League during the 2011–12 season.

Managerial career
In September 2018, Carević joined his former club Hajduk Split, this time as an assistant manager, as part of newly-appointed coaching staff under manager Zoran Vulić. In a previous coaching stint at the club, Carević was a player under Vulić. In fact, Carević, with 107 appearances, was Vulić's most used player in the 156 matches he spent on the bench of Hajduk. At the end of November 2018 Vulić was sacked and Carević left the club's staff.

On 1 May 2019 Carević was appointed the manager of Hrvatski Dragovoljac, following the departure of Krešimir Sunara. He left the club in the following month after four games in charge with a record of one victory, one draw and two defeats.

A month after his departure from Hrvatski Dragovoljac, he became an assistant manager under manager Ognjen Vukojević, in the Croatia U20's coaching staff.

In September 2020, he was named the manager of Rudeš playing in the Druga HNL. He was sacked on 22 March 2021. The club explained the move by stating that Carević's job was to stabilize the club in the league, which he managed to do as they were fifth at that moment. He was dismissed as manager of Varaždin after only six games in charge in September 2021, only to return to Slovenia the same month to manage Krka.

Managerial statistics

References

External links
 
Mario Carević at hrnogomet.com 
Mario Carević at the Football Association of Slovenia 

1982 births
Living people
Sportspeople from Makarska
Association football midfielders
Croatian footballers
Croatia youth international footballers
Croatia under-21 international footballers
Croatia international footballers
HNK Hajduk Split players
Ittihad FC players
VfB Stuttgart players
K.S.C. Lokeren Oost-Vlaanderen players
K.V. Kortrijk players
Maccabi Petah Tikva F.C. players
NK Krka players
Croatian Football League players
Saudi Professional League players
Bundesliga players
Belgian Pro League players
Israeli Premier League players
Slovenian PrvaLiga players
Croatian expatriate footballers
Croatian expatriate sportspeople in Saudi Arabia
Expatriate footballers in Saudi Arabia
Croatian expatriate sportspeople in Germany
Expatriate footballers in Germany
Croatian expatriate sportspeople in Belgium
Expatriate footballers in Belgium
Croatian expatriate sportspeople in Israel
Expatriate footballers in Israel
Croatian expatriate sportspeople in Slovenia
Expatriate footballers in Slovenia
Croatian football managers
NK Hrvatski Dragovoljac managers
NK Rudeš managers
NK Krka managers
HNK Hajduk Split non-playing staff
Croatian expatriate football managers
Expatriate football managers in Slovenia